Radical 122 or radical net meaning "net" is one of the 29 Kangxi radicals (214 radicals in total) composed of 6 strokes.

In the Kangxi Dictionary, there are 163 characters (out of 49,030) to be found under this radical.

, a variant form of this radical character, is the 107th indexing component in the Table of Indexing Chinese Character Components predominantly adopted by Simplified Chinese dictionaries published in mainland China.

Evolution

Derived characters

Literature

External links

Unihan Database - U+7F51

122
107